Bhavani is an Indian river which flows through Indian states of Kerala and Tamil Nadu, India. It originates from the Western Ghats of Kerala and is one among the three rivers of Kerala which flows in eastward direction.

Hydrography
Bhavani river originates from Nilgiri hills of the Western Ghats, enters the Silent Valley National Park in Kerala and flows back towards Tamil Nadu. Its watershed drains an area of  spread over Tamil Nadu (87%), Kerala (9%) and Karnataka (4%). The main river courses majorly through Coimbatore district and Erode district in Tamil Nadu. About 90 percent of the river's water is used for agriculture irrigation. The Bhavani River is one of the main tributaries of the Cauvery River.

The river joins the Cauvery at the Kooduthurai holy site near Bhavani.

Tributaries

Twelve major rivulets including West and East Varagar rivers join Bhavani draining the southern Nilgiri slopes. At Mukkali, Bhavani takes an abrupt 120-degree turn towards the northeast and flows for another  through Attappady plateau. It gets reinforced by the Kunda river coming from the north. Siruvani river, a perennial stream and the Kodungarapallam river, flowing from the south and southeast respectively join the Bhavani at Kerala-Tamil Nadu border. The river then flows east along the base of Nilgiris and enters the plains near Bathra Kaliamman temple at Mettupalayam after joining with Coonoor river coming from northwest.

After the Moyar it is blocked by the Lower Bhavani Dam, feeding Lower Bhavani Project Canal near Sathyamangalam in Erode District. The river continues east for over  through Erode District, traversing Kodiveri Dam, near Gobichettipalayam which feeds the Arakkankottai and Thadappalli canals constructed for agricultural purposes. A small barrage across the river was built by Kalingarayan in 1283 CE to feed the  Kalingarayan irrigation canal.

Dams

Bhavanisagar

The Bhavanisagar dam is located on the Bhavani river in Erode district, Tamil Nadu, India. The dam is one of the largest earthen dams in the world. The Lower Bhavani Project was the first major irrigation project initiated in India after independence in 1948. It was completed by 1955 and opened for use in 1956.

The dam has two hydel power stations, one on the east bank canal and the other on the Bhavani river.

Kodiveri

The Kodiveri dam is located on the Bhavani River near Gobichettipalayam in Western Tamil Nadu. It was constructed by Kongalvan in the year 1125 CE.

Pollution
Industrial, municipal and agricultural pollution of the river results in poor water quality and negative impacts on the health of people, plants and animals dependent on the river water.

References

 
Rivers of Tamil Nadu
Rivers of Palakkad district
Ancient Indian rivers
Sacred rivers
Rivers of India